Herman Naiwincx (1623, Schoonhoven – 1670, Hamburg), was a Dutch Golden Age landscape painter and printmaker.

Biography
According to the RKD he worked in Amsterdam from 1648-1650 and in Schoonhoven in 1651. He is known for prints, Italianate landscapes and architectural studies. He is known for working with Willem Schellinks.

It is unknown whether he moved to Hamburg, or died there on one of his business trips.

References

Herman Naiwincx on Artnet
Works by Herman Naiwinx at the Museum of New Zealand Te Papa Tongarewa

External links
 

1623 births
1670 deaths
Dutch Golden Age painters
Dutch male painters
People from Schoonhoven